Destination Milan is a 1954 film which consists of three episodes directed by Lawrence Huntington, Leslie Arliss, and John Gilling which first appeared independently of each other on television. The producer was Tom D. Connochie.

The 3 episodes of Rheingold Theatre (1953) are introduced by Douglas Fairbanks. Arliss' "Lowland Fling" is a comedic story with  Cyril Cusack, John Laurie and Barbara Mullen. Gilling's "The Guilty Person" is a melodrama with Greta Gynt and Peter Reynolds as Karel, a Norwegian artist who murders his brother. Huntington's "Destination Milan" features parallel stories of travellers on the Orient Express - a circus performer's wife with circus agent Christopher Lee, and an American tourist saved from buying a fake painting by intervention of a train guard.

References

1954 films